Jin Zhipeng is a Chinese swimmer. He won a gold medal at the Men's 50 metre breaststroke SB3 event at the 2016 Summer Paralympics with a world record and paralympic record of 47.54. He also won a silver medal at the Men's 100 metre freestyle S4 event with 1:26.05, another silver medal at the Men's 150 metre individual medley SM4 event with 2:26.91 and a bronze medal at the Men's 200 metre freestyle S4 event with 3:03.94.

References

Living people
Swimmers at the 2016 Summer Paralympics
Medalists at the 2016 Summer Paralympics
Paralympic gold medalists for China
Paralympic silver medalists for China
Paralympic bronze medalists for China
Paralympic swimmers of China
Chinese male medley swimmers
Chinese male breaststroke swimmers
Chinese male freestyle swimmers
Year of birth missing (living people)
Paralympic medalists in swimming
S4-classified Paralympic swimmers
21st-century Chinese people